The Rolls-Royce/SNECMA M45H is an Anglo-French medium bypass ratio turbofan produced specifically for the twin-engined VFW-Fokker 614 aircraft in the early 1970s.

The design was started as a collaborative effort between Bristol Siddeley and SNECMA.

Design and development

The VFW 614 was designed to operate over short sectors with up to a dozen flights a day. The engines were optimized for 30-minute sectors at a cruise altitude of 21,000 feet at Mach 0.65. Only a few minutes would be spent at the cruise rating and most of the flight would be at the higher climb rating or at a descent setting. The engine had a low turbine entry temperature and comparatively low rotational speed.

The engine was designed to be uprated without drastic redesign. Three options were water injection (+10% thrust), improved HP turbine (+10% thrust), addition of a zero-stage to the LP compressor (+25% thrust).

The engine was developed at the time of the Rolls-Royce bankruptcy which resulted in delays in developing the engine.

Variants

M45F Civil low bypass turbofan  for take-off.
M45G Military low bypass turbofan  for take-off, wet.
M45HCivil medium bypass turbofan  for take-off, wet.
RB.410Rolls-Royce designation for the M45SD-02 geared turbofan
M45SD-02

Engines on display

Rolls-Royce/SNECMA M45H engines are on display as part of the aero engine collection at the Royal Air Force Museum Cosford and the Musée aéronautique et spatial Safran. Additionally, an engine, with its cowl and pylon, is displayed at the Deutsches Museum Flugwerft Schleissheim; this museum also displays a VFW-614, which has two engines mounted.

Specifications (M45H Mk.501)

See also

References

Further reading

 
 
 Swanborough, Gordon. Air Enthusiast, Volume One. London: Pilot Press, 1971. .

External links

 Stol Fans from Dowty a 1971-01-21 Flight International article

Medium-bypass turbofan engines
1970s turbofan engines
M45H